Barison I or Barisone I was the judge of Arborea from around 1038 until about 1060 and then of Logudoro until his death sometime around 1073. He is the first ruler of Logudoro of whom we have any real knowledge. His whole policy was opposition to the Republic of Pisa and support of monastic immigration from mainland Italy. His wife was Preziosa de Orrubu.

On hearing of the death of the judge of Logudoro around 1060, Barison gave Arborea to his nephew (or son) Marianus and went to Porto Torres to receive the vacant judgeship.

In 1063, Barisone gave a gift of a large territory and two churches, including the Byzantine church of Nostra Segnora de Mesumundu and that of Sant'Elia di Montesanto, to the abbey of Montecassino and asked the abbot Desiderius of Benevento to send twelve monks to establish the Benedictine rule on the island of Sardinia. Desiderius sent them, via Gaeta, with books, relics, and other religious and cultural items. However, determined to maintain a religious monopoly in Sardinia, the Pisan archdiocese attacked the monks at sea off the Giglio Island, where four died. The remaining eight returned to Montecassino. While Pope Alexander II excommunicated the Pisans for the assault, only the intervention of Godfrey the Bearded, margrave of Tuscany, secured satisfaction to the monastery and to Barisone.
In 1065 finally the monks, sent by Desiderius, arrived to the island and took possession of the territory and the churches and founded a small monastery, adjacent to the church of Nostra Segnora de Mesumundu.

In that same year, Barisone associated his nephew (or son) Andrew Tanca with him in the government and this Marianus succeeded him on his death.

References

Sources
Ferrabino, Aldo (ed). Dizionario Biografico degli Italiani: VI Baratteri – Bartolozzi. Rome, 1964.
Scano, D. "Serie cronol. dei giudici sardi." Arch. stor. sardo. 1939.
Besta, E. and Somi, A. I condaghi di San Nicolas di Trullas e di Santa Maria di Bonarcado. Milan, 1937.

1073 deaths
Judges (judikes) of Arborea
Year of birth unknown
Judges (judikes) of Logudoro
11th-century rulers in Europe